Madonna and Child with Saint Jerome and Saint Mary Magdalene is a 1495 oil on panel painting by Cima da Conegliano, now in the Alte Pinakothek, Munich, having been bought for the Bavarian royal collections in 1815 from the Empress Josephine's collection at Malmaison.

References

1495 paintings
Paintings of the Madonna and Child by Cima da Conegliano
Paintings of Jerome
Paintings depicting Mary Magdalene
Collection of the Alte Pinakothek